Akira Ishikawa (jp. , Ishikawa Akira; born 10 November 1934 in Yokosuka, Kanagawa Prefecture; died 10 February 2002) was a Japanese jazz drummer and bandleader.

Ishikawa began his music career with Shin Matsumoto and New Pacific. In the following years he toured with his own formations like Akira Miyazawa Modern Allstars and Toshio Hosaka. In later years he played with Toshiyuki Miyama and his band New Herd; 1964/65 he did recordings with Miyamas Modern Jazz Highlights and Modern Jukebox. From the late '60s, he recorded LPs under his own name as Soul Session (1969) and The Gentures in Beat Pops (1970), with, among others, Hiromasa Suzuki, Kiyoshi Sugimoto and Masaoki Terakawa. With his band Count Buffaloes, the jazz-rock oriented album Electrum was out in 1970,  followed by Drums Concerto (1971), African Rock (1972), Uganda (1972) and Get Up! (1975). He also worked with Yoshiko Goto, Koichi Oki, Kiyoshi Sugimoto (Our Time, 1974) and Akio Sasaki (Berklee Connection, 1980) in the 1970s. In the field of jazz he was involved between 1964 and 1980 in 14 recording sessions.

References

External links 

1934 births
2002 deaths
Japanese musicians
Jazz drummers